In Tibetan cuisine, Masen (Má sēn, 麻森)is a pastry, made with tsampa, dry cubic or curd cheese, yak butter, brown sugar and water.

See also
 List of pastries
 List of Tibetan dishes

References

Cheese dishes
Chinese desserts
Chinese pastries
Tibetan cuisine